Ashok Kumar Karki (born 18 February 1956) is a Nepalese weightlifter. He competed in the men's bantamweight event at the 1980 Summer Olympics.

References

1956 births
Living people
Nepalese male weightlifters
Olympic weightlifters of Nepal
Weightlifters at the 1980 Summer Olympics
Place of birth missing (living people)
20th-century Nepalese people